The Second Presbyterian Church in Portsmouth, Ohio is a historic church at 801 Waller Street.

It was built in 1911 and was a work of architect George W. Kramer.

It was added to the National Register of Historic Places in 1996. As of 2012 the congregation is affiliated with the Presbyterian Church (U.S.A.).

References

External links
Official church website

Presbyterian churches in Ohio
Churches on the National Register of Historic Places in Ohio
Gothic Revival church buildings in Ohio
Churches completed in 1911
National Register of Historic Places in Scioto County, Ohio
Churches in Portsmouth, Ohio